Qomshan (also Romanized as Qomshān and Qamshān; also known as Qamīshan and Qomīshān) is a village in Emamzadeh Abdol Aziz Rural District, Jolgeh District, Isfahan County, Isfahan Province, Iran. At the 2006 census, its population was 356, in 91 families.

References 

Populated places in Isfahan County